This is a list of anime by release date which covers Japanese animated productions that were made between 1917–1938. Anime in Japan can be traced back to three key figures whom in the early 20th century started experimenting with paper animation. It is unknown when the first animated film was made, but historians have tied the year 1917 as being the key date. Very few of the first animations that were made survive to this day due to the 1923 Great Kantō earthquake. At one point it was even thought that all animated works made before the earthquake were lost until the discovery of two films in 2008. Production of animated works resumed again after the earthquake, and by the early/mid 1930s sound, and cel animation were starting to appear. Later in the decade, Japan went to war with China, resulting in paper needed for the war to be used sparingly. As a result, new manga stories disappeared from the public while the Japanese government stepped in to regulate what was being released through the cinemas to take its place. The mid to late 1930s saw more animated works that were propaganda-themed to rally the public's support.

1917–1922
Japanese animation can be traced back to 1917 as a year of definitive firsts. The three key figures at the time were Ōten Shimokawa, Seitarou Kitayama, and Junichi Kouchi each contributing to making the first short films that would be known as anime. While each one of these people are respected in their own right, the status of "first animated film" remains in dispute as there is conflicting information regarding film premiere dates. According to contemporary sources of the time, an unknown titled film of Tennenshoku Katsudō Shashin premiered in January. Evidence of this comes from Kinema Record, with the July edition making specific claim to the first release occurring in January, but does not specify the title of the work. Shimokawa's film Imokawa Mukozo the Doorman is conventionally and largely claimed to be the first work, but contemporary sources portray it as the "third" film. Speculation about the error is debated, but the two now lost films and their contents have been reported by various sources allowing for a clearer picture of the early history.

The first confirmed film release occurred in the first ten days of February, with Shimokawa's . The film was produced with chalk on a blackboard, with redrawing for each frame. Shimokawa would switch to paper for later, but the exact date and work to depict the switch is unknown. This film is currently the earliest surviving work, and was only rediscovered in March 2008. Katsudō Shashin was widely reported as possibly dating to 1907, but is of unconfirmed origin and is not known to have premiered or been produced for commercial interest.

Of the animated films produced in 1918, only one surviving film called "Momotarō" remains. This particular film is notable for being the first animated film to be shown outside Japan. There are no known animated films that were made from 1919 to 1923 in existence, which could be the result of the 1923 Great Kantō earthquake.

1923 earthquake

The Great Kantō earthquake which occurred on September 1, 1923 dealt incredible damage in Japan with 105,385 confirmed deaths. The damage from this natural disaster was the greatest sustained prior to World War II. Prior to the rediscovery of several Japanese animated films it was presumed that all prints produced up to its date had been destroyed. The account and record of these films themselves has been expanded, with Patten's Watching Anime, Reading Manga: 25 Years of Essays and Reviews 2004 book claiming that three films were produced in 1917 when over a dozen works are now known.  Despite the findings, the earthquake along with World War II have resulted in only 4% of all Japanese films made before 1945 being known to exist today.

1924–1938

After the earthquake, production of new films took place within a year. For the early films, benshi, storytellers were hired who sat next to the screen and narrated the silent movies. They were descendants of kabuki jōruri, kōdan storytellers, theater barkers and other forms of oral storytelling. The first animated "talkie" or sound film titled Chikara to Onna no Yo no Naka ("World of Power and Women") was made in 1933, now a lost film it was a breakthrough for Japanese animation. However, at the time more than 80 percent of movies made in the country were still silents.<ref>{{cite book|title=The Transition to Sound in Japan in History on/and/in Film|author=Freiberg, Freda|publisher=Perth: History & Film Association of Australia|year=1987|page=76}}</ref> By the mid 1930s the animation style was changing as well, chiyogami or paper animation was being phased out in favor of cel animation. Previously this latter form had been dismissed as too costly to use. In 1934, the first entirely cel animated short entitled The Dance of the Chagamas was made. Cel animated shorts of the mid 1930s borrowed aspects that were being used at the time by Disney. Towards the end of the decade, political events taking place at home as well as abroad were changing animation styles in Japan towards propaganda, and national pride.Note: The kanji 漫画 means "cartoon", this is found before some of the titles in the sources listed below.''

See also
List of anime by release date (1939–1945)
List of anime by release date (1946–1959)
List of years in animation
History of anime
Cinema of Japan
Kamishibai

Notes

References

External links 
Japanese animated works of the period, listed in the IMDb

Release date
Anime debuts by date
Years in anime
1910s in animation
1920s in animation
1930s in animation